My Fantastic Funeral is a South Korean two-episodes television drama starring Kyung Soo-jin and Choi Woo-shik. It aired on September 26, 2015 as part of Chuseok Drama Special.

Synopsis

Cast
Kyung Soo-jin as Jang Mi-soo 
Choi Woo-shik as Park Dong-soo 
 Yu Ha-jun as Yoo Se-ho 
 Kim Chung as Jang Mi-soo's mother
 Kim Min Ha as Da Eun - soo's sister
 Han Sang-jin
 Seo Lee-sook as Young-ran
 Park Jin-joo as Na-rae
 Lee Dae-ro as Grandfather at pharmacy

References

External links 
 My Fantastic Funeral at SBS 
 KBS Drama Special at KBS World
 

2015 South Korean television series debuts
2015 South Korean television series endings
Seoul Broadcasting System television dramas
Korean-language television shows